Giuliano Ryu Alesi (born 20 September 1999) is a French-Japanese racing driver. He is the son of Japanese former actress Kumiko Goto and former Formula One driver Jean Alesi.

Career

Karting
Born in Avignon, Alesi began karting in 2013 before competing in the KF3 category in 2013 where he finished 14th overall and the KFJ category in 2014 with Baby Race SRL, finishing 28th in the standings.

French F4 Championship
In March 2015, it was announced that Alesi would step up from karting to cars in the 2015 season. In the first race, he took pole position and took victory as well as setting the fastest lap. He secured two more victories and two junior victories and finished second in the junior category and fourth in the overall standings.

GP3 Series

2016 
In December 2015, Alesi took part in GP3 post-season testing with Arden International and Jenzer Motorsport. That same month, it was announced that Alesi would race in the 2016 season. In February 2016, it was announced that Alesi would race with Trident. After several races at the back of the grid, he scored his first point in GP3 Series in the feature race of Spa-Francorchamps.

2017 
Alesi remained in GP3 for the 2017 season, once again driving with Trident. Having scored his first podium at the Red Bull Ring, the Frenchman took victory in the Sprint race at Silverstone. He followed this up by another win in Hungary, with a third win coming at the round in Spa-Francorchamps. He ended up fifth in the standings, having taken more points from two of the final three events.

2018 
In 2018 he scored 100 points and finished seventh in the standings, only six points behind his Trident teammate, Pedro Piquet. Alesi won one race and finished on the podium on three other occasions.

FIA Formula 2 Championship

2019 

On December 8, 2018, Trident Racing announced that Alesi would be driving for the team in the 2019 FIA Formula 2 Championship, alongside Ralph Boschung. Alesi had a slow start to the season, scoring only one point during the first half of the season, that being at the Paul Ricard feature race. From the event at Monza however, he only failed to score points at the feature race in Sochi. He finished the season in 15th place, scoring 20 points, however, he could not prevent Trident from finishing last in the team championship.

2020 
For the 2020 Formula 2 season, Alesi switched to his father's former DTM team HWA Racelab, driving alongside Artem Markelov. Despite a strong start to his season with a sixth place at the opening race in Austria, Alesi failed to score points with the team afterwards. As his father Jean later clarified, they had "banked on the wrong team", with the Frenchman eventually switching to MP Motorsport for the final three rounds. He finished his season by scoring another sixth place at the season finale, which landed him 17th in the championship.

Formula One
In March 2016, Alesi was inducted into the Ferrari Driver Academy (along with fellow GP3 driver Charles Leclerc), aligning him with the same team his father raced for in the early nineties. He left the academy after his first F1 test, in which he drove a Ferrari SF71H.

Super Formula Lights

After leaving the Ferrari Driver Academy, Alesi set his sights on Formula racing in Asia, and more specifically Super Formula Lights, where he was signed to TOM'S, alongside Japanese pair Kazuko Kotaka and Hibiki Taira.

Super Formula

Alesi made his debut in the Super Formula on 25 April 2021 filling in for Kazuki Nakajima, where he managed to finish ninth and get two points. On 15 May 2021, he managed to get his first pole in Autopolis and converted the pole to his first win in the series on the 16 May 2021. Alesi continues racing with the team on several round and gets 11th in the standings. He stays with TOM'S for another season as a full time driver. Alesi stays again with TOM'S to compete in 2023 Super Formula.

Super GT
Alesi competed in Super GT with team Arto alongside Sean Walkinshaw in the GT300 category. The Next Season he promoted to the GT500 category, joining the 2021 Title winner Team au TOM'S pairing with Sho Tsuboi as he replaces Yuhi Sekiguchi who moves to SARD. Alesi and Tsuboi clinched their podium in the second round which runs halfway through due to crash of Mitsunori Takaboshi. Alesi swith with Ritomo Miyata to the other car for 2023 season, he will paired with Ex Honda driver Ukyo Sasahara.

Racing record

Karting career summary

Racing career summary

Complete French F4 Championship results
(key) (Races in bold indicate pole position) (Races in italics indicate fastest lap)

Complete GP3 Series results
(key) (Races in bold indicate pole position) (Races in italics indicate fastest lap)

† Driver did not finish the race, but was classified as he completed over 90% of the race distance.

Complete FIA Formula 2 Championship results
(key) (Races in bold indicate pole position) (Races in italics indicate points for the fastest lap of top ten finishers)

Complete Super GT results
(key) (Races in bold indicate pole position; races in italics indicate fastest lap)

‡ Half points awarded as less than 75% of race distance was completed.

Complete Super Formula Lights results
(key) (Races in bold indicate pole position; races in italics indicate fastest lap)

Complete Super Formula results
(key) (Races in bold indicate pole position; races in italics indicate fastest lap)

‡ Half points awarded as less than 75% of race distance was completed.

References

External links

1998 births
Living people
Sportspeople from Avignon
French racing drivers
French F4 Championship drivers
MRF Challenge Formula 2000 Championship drivers
French GP3 Series drivers
FIA Formula 2 Championship drivers
French people of Sicilian descent
French people of Japanese descent
French sportspeople of Italian descent
Trident Racing drivers
MP Motorsport drivers
Japanese racing drivers
Super GT drivers
Super Formula drivers
Toyota Gazoo Racing drivers
TOM'S drivers
Auto Sport Academy drivers
HWA Team drivers